The Mammoth Cave Parkway is a major roadway located in the Mammoth Cave National Park in west-central Kentucky. It encompasses parts of Kentucky Routes 70 and 255 within the park in northwestern Barren and eastern Edmonson Counties. It closely follows the Mammoth Cave Railroad Bike & Hike Trail.

Route description
Mammoth Cave Parkway is marked by Kentucky Route 255 from U.S. Route 31W, through the I-65 exit 48 interchange. The Kentucky Transportation Cabinet maintains the road from US 31W to just beyond the I-65 interchange, while the NPS maintains the rest of the road beyond the I-65 junction. The road continues northward to the junction with Kentucky Route 70 (KY 70) near the Barren-Edmonson County line within the Mammoth Cave National Park.

It turns left onto KY 70 westbound past the Sloans Crossing Pond Trail, while KY 255 gets co-joined with KY 70 eastbound for a couple of miles. A little beyond Sloan's Crossing Pond, KY 70 westbound leaves the parkway by making a left turn towards Brownsville, while the Mammoth Cave Parkway continues north to end at the Visitor's Center beyond the intersections with East Entrance, Carmichael, Green River Ferry, and Flint Ridge Roads. The parkway ends in the Visitor's Center parking lot and an intersection with an access road to the woodland cottages.

Attractions along the route
Diamond Caverns 
Sloan's Crossing Pond Trail
Doyle Valley Scenic Overlook
Mammoth Cave Campground and Caver's Camp Store
Hercules and Coach No. 2
Mammoth Cave National Park Visitor's Center

History 
The Mammoth Cave Parkway was originally built alongside the original path of the Mammoth Cave Railroad (1886–1931), which ran from the original town of Mammoth Cave to Park City (originally known as Glasgow Junction). When the Mammoth Cave Parkway first opened (as a local road), portions of the road, along with Cave City Road (also known as East Entrance Road), a small piece of Green River Ferry Road, and all of Joppa Ridge Road west of the visitor's center was part of the original alignment of KY 70 from 1929 until the 1970s. KY 70 was re-routed to its current alignment in the 1970s. The road became maintained by the National Park Service once Mammoth Cave became a national park.

In 2004, both of Mammoth Cave Parkway's junctions with KY 70 were reconstructed just before the completion of the Mammoth Cave Railroad Bike and Hike Trail.

Major intersections

References

External links
Mammoth Cave National Park - Official Web Site

Transportation in Barren County, Kentucky
Transportation in Edmonson County, Kentucky
Kentucky Route 70
Mammoth Cave National Park